Bernard Desmarais (born June 17, 1971) is a Mauritian swimmer. He represented his country at the 1992 and 1996 Olympics. In 1992, he competed in the 100 metre and 200 metre breaststroke competitions, but finished 45th in each event with times of 1:07.75 and 2:31.52 respectively. In 1996, he competed only in the 100 metre breaststroke event and finished 43rd out of 45 competitors with a time of 1:09.05.

References

External links
 

1971 births
Living people
Mauritian Creoles
Olympic swimmers of Mauritius
Mauritian male swimmers
Swimmers at the 1992 Summer Olympics
Swimmers at the 1996 Summer Olympics
African Games bronze medalists for Mauritius
African Games medalists in swimming
Competitors at the 1991 All-Africa Games
Male breaststroke swimmers